State Highway 37 (abbreviated SH-37) is a designation for two separate highways in the state of Oklahoma. The northern section runs between Hinton and Moore in central Oklahoma, while the southern section runs from the Texas state line at the Red River to Idabel, in southeastern Oklahoma. The northern section of SH-37 runs  from US-281 in Hinton to Sunnylane Road (former SH-77H) in Moore.

Route descriptions

Central Oklahoma
The SH-37 in Central Oklahoma begins at US-281 in Hinton, Caddo County.

Back in Caddo County, SH-37 runs three miles (5 km) south to the town of Cogar, where it joins SH-152, and turns to the east. This concurrency goes two miles (3 km) before entering Grady County.

In Grady County, SH-37/SH-152 goes  to the east to US-81. There SH-152 turns to the north, and SH-37 joins US-81 for a one-and-a-half mile concurrency to Minco, where SH-37 splits off and heads east once again.

One mile into McClain County, SH-37 serves as the northern terminus for SH-76, then joins I-44 for a brief concurrency three miles later. SH-37 overlaps I-44 for three miles (5 km), running north across the Canadian River into Cleveland County and Oklahoma City, where it runs east along S.W. 134th Street into the city of Moore, where it becomes S. 4th Street.

SH-37 ends at Sunnylane Road, formerly SH-77H, in Moore.

Southeastern Oklahoma
The southeastern SH-37 begins where TX-37 crosses the Red River into Oklahoma, and heads north for two miles (3 km) to a junction with SH-98.

History

Central Oklahoma

The portion of SH-37 in Moore between Janeway Avenue (just west of I-35) and its eastern terminus at Sunnylane Road was in the damage path of the EF-5 tornado that hit Moore on 20 May 2013.

Southeastern Oklahoma

The southeastern SH-37 was originally numbered as SH-57.

Junction lists

Central Oklahoma

Southeastern Oklahoma

References

External links
 Northern SH-37 at Roadklahoma
 Southern SH-37 at Roadklahoma

037
Transportation in Oklahoma City
Transportation in Caddo County, Oklahoma
Transportation in Canadian County, Oklahoma
Transportation in Grady County, Oklahoma
Transportation in McClain County, Oklahoma
Transportation in Cleveland County, Oklahoma
Transportation in McCurtain County, Oklahoma